Agios Nikolaos (Greek: Άγιος Νικόλαος) is a village in the municipal unit of Eleios-Pronnoi on the island Cephalonia, Greece. Its population is 96 people (2011 census). It is situated in an inland valley, at 280 m elevation. It is 3 km southeast of Digaleto, 4 km north of Xenopoulo, 6 km northwest of Poros and 20 km east of Argostoli. The road from Poros to Sami passes through the village. Agios Nikolaos suffered great damage from the 1953 Ionian earthquake. The village has an elementary school and a church dedicated to Saint Gerasimos.

Population

See also

List of settlements in Cephalonia

References

Eleios-Pronnoi
Populated places in Cephalonia